Frances Jones Dandridge (April 10, 1710April 1785) was the mother of Martha Washington, the first First Lady of the United States. She was born in New Kent County, Virginia. Her father Orlando Jones and maternal grandfather Colonel Gideon Macon served on the House of Burgesses in Colonial Virginia. Her parents were prosperous Virginia landowners. 

Her mother Martha Macon died when she was six and her father remarried before his death. She was then raised by her stepmother Mary Elizabeth Williams Jones and later her new husband John James Flourney. A few years after having herself emancipated at the age of sixteen, Frances married John Dandridge—a prominent planter, Colonel in the local militia, and Clerk of Courts—on July 22, 1730 in New Kent County, Virginia. The lived at the Chestnut Grove plantation and a house in Williamsburg and had eight children.

Early life
Frances Jones, nicknamed Fanny, was born in 1710 on a plantation near Williamsburg near the capital on Queen's Creek. Fanny had an older brother, Lane Jones, born in 1707. Fanny's father, Orlando Jones, was a Burgess for New Kent County in 1718 in the House of Burgesses, the leading legislative body in Colonial Virginia. He was also a planter with 21 enslaved people. Her mother, Martha Macon Jones, daughter of Colonel Gideon Macon, died when Fanny was only six years old. Her father soon remarried. His second wife, Mary Elizabeth William Jones, became the sole parent of the two children just three years later when Orlando Jones died. Orlando and Mary had no children together.

A year later, Orlando's widow Mary Elizabeth married John James Flourney and her stepchildren lived with them in Williamsburg. The union of Flourneys brought more children into the household. While the Jones children lived with their guardians, the Flourneys had a right to use the income from the Queen's Creek property for their household. Anna Maria Jones Timson, the sister of the late Orlando Jones sued twice for custody of her niece and nephew, but was denied. When Lane Jones reached the age of eighteen, he legally emancipated himself and moved in with his aunt in Timson's Neck.

In 1726, when Fanny was sixteen, she also sued for emancipation. She did not move in with her aunt, but instead lived with a planter in New Kent. Her mother's parents had been from that region and a number of Macon aunts and uncles who lived there. She may have lived with Unity West Dandridge, her mother's half-sister, who had married William Dandridge in 1719.

Marriage

Fanny Jones married John Dandridge on July 22, 1730. Fanny inherited ten enslaved people and land in King William County from her father, which she brought to the marriage. The Dandridges lived at the Chestnut Grove plantation on the bank of the Pamunkey River in New Kent County, Virginia. Located about 35 miles from Williamsburg, it was a two-story frame house that was surrounded by fruit and chestnut trees.

Dandridge immigrated to the Virginia Colony in 1714 or 1715. Born to John and Ann Dandridge of England, he immigrated with his older brother William Dandridge (1689–1743). He and his wife Unity West Dandridge, an heiress, lived on the opposite bank of the river from Chestnut Grove at his Elsing Green estate in King William County, Virginia. 

Before his marriage, Dandridge was the Deputy Clerk while Colonel John Thornton was the Clerk of Courts; the courthouse was located four miles from his home. Dandridge became Clerk of Courts in New Kent in 1730, upon Thornton's death and held the position for 26 years. He also managed his 500-acre tobacco plantation, which was prosperous due to the use of 15 to 20 enslaved workers. Owning enslaved people was a sign of wealth and status. Others with larger plantations or positions of influence in the House of Burgesses or the Governor's Council were among the elite gentry.

He was vestryman for St. Peter's Church, Church of England. Dandridge was a Colonel in his military district.

Children

The Dandridges had eight children: 

 Martha Dandridge Custis Washington (1731-1802)
 John Dandridge (1733–1749)
 William Dandridge (1734–1776)
 Bartholomew Dandridge (1737–1785)
 Anna Maria "Fanny" Dandridge Bassett (1739–1777)
 Frances Dandridge (1744–1757)
 Elizabeth Dandridge Aylett Henley (1749–1800)
 Mary Dandridge (1756–1763)

Fanny was pregnant or nursing for nearly 25 years. She lost a number of children through miscarriages and stillbirths:
 A stillborn son (1732)
 A stillborn daughter (1735)
 A miscarried daughter (1736)
 A miscarried daughter (1738)
 A miscarried son (1741)
 A miscarried son (1743)
 A stillborn daughter (1746)
 A stillborn daughter (1748)
 A stillborn daughter (1751)
 A stillborn son (1753)

As was typical of the time, the children were educated at home to ready them for life among the gentry, including religious education, music, and dance.

Martha first married Daniel Parke Custis, from one of the richest families in Virginia, at Chestnut Grove. When he died, in 1757, he left an estate of about 300 enslaved people and 17,500 acres. Following his death, she married George Washington at the White House plantation. They lived at Mount Vernon and she later became First Lady of the United States of America.

One of their sons, Bartholomew Dandridge, followed in his father's footsteps and became Clerk of Courts in New Kent County. And he, like his father, also served as both vestryman and churchwarden, but at the Blisland Parish rather than the St. Peter's Parish.

John Dandridge had two illegitimate children: Ann Dandridge Costin and Ralph Dandridge.

Later life
Her husband, Colonel John Dandridge, died in Fredericksburg on August 21, 1756. He was interred at St. George's Episcopal Church in Fredericksburg. After her husband's death, Fanny and three of her children–William, Mary, and Elizabeth—continued to live at Chestnut Grove. Fanny was 46 years old and had just given birth to her last child that year. At age 22, William took over management of the plantation.

Bartholomew listed Chestnut Grove for sale in 1768. Fanny moved to Pamocra, where she died in April 1785, within days of the death of her son Bartholomew, and they were buried in the one-acre graveyard.

Notes

References

Bibliography

Further reading

External links
Virginia Historical Society - John Dandridge c. 1715

1710 births
1785 deaths
Colonial American women
Dandridge family of Virginia
People from New Kent County, Virginia
Virginia colonial people